The Arm DevSummit (previously DevCon and Arm TechCon) is usually a three-day information technology conference held annually in October by Arm. The event is used to showcase new hardware, software and technologies using ARM processors. Arm DevSummit is also an event hosted for third-party software developers that work with ARM-powered devices.

The first ever DevCon was held in 2004.

Arm DevSummit was hosted as online-only conferences in 2020, 2021 and 2022 due to the COVID-19 pandemic.

History

2000s

2004 
DevCon 2004, with the tag line "The Evolution of the Digital World", was held circa October 2004 at the Santa Clara Convention Center, California.

2008 
DevCon 2008 was held from October 7 to October 9, 2008 at the Santa Clara Convention Center, California.

2009 
Arm TechCon 2009, stylized as Arm TechCon3, with the tag line "Design to the Power of Three", was held on October 23, 2009 at the Santa Clara Convention Center, California.

2010s

2010 
Arm TechCon 2010, with the tag line "The Core of Your Future", was held from November 9 to November 11, 2010 at the Santa Clara Convention Center, California.

2011 
Arm TechCon 2011, with the tag line "Join the Community Defining the Future", was held from October 25 to October 27, 2011 at the Santa Clara Convention Center, California.

2012 
Arm TechCon 2012 was held from October 30 to November 1, 2011 at the Santa Clara Convention Center, California.

2013 
Arm TechCon 2013, with the tag line "Where Intelligence Connects", was held from October 29 to October 31, 2013 at the Santa Clara Convention Center, California.

2014 
Arm TechCon 2014 was held from October 1 to October 3, 2014 at the Santa Clara Convention Center, California.

2015 
Arm TechCon 2015 was held from November 10 to November 12, 2015 at the Santa Clara Convention Center, California.

2016 
Arm TechCon 2016 was held from October 25 to October 27, 2016 at the Santa Clara Convention Center, California.

2017 
Arm TechCon 2017, with the tag line "Tackling the challenges of securing a trillion connected devices", was held from October 24 to October 26, 2017 at the Santa Clara Convention Center, California.

2018 
Arm TechCon 2018, with the tag line "Arm to reveal details on the 5G, cloud and IoT infrastructures for a trillion connected devices", was held from October 16 to October 18, 2018 at the San Jose Convention Center, California.

2019 
Arm TechCon 2019, with the tag line "Showcasing the New Era of Total Compute", was held from October 8 to October 10, 2019 at the San Jose McEnery Convention Center, California.

2020s

2020 
Arm DevSummit 2020 was held from October 5 to October 9, 2020 as an online-only conference due to the COVID-19 pandemic.

2021 
Arm DevSummit 2021, with the tag line "Where Hardware and Software Join Forces", was held from October 19 to October 21, 2021 as an online-only conference due to the COVID-19 pandemic.

2022 
Arm DevSummit 2022, with the tag line "Build Your Future on Arm", is an upcoming online technology conference for software developers on October 26 with workshops on November 7 and 9.

See also 
 Google I/O
 Microsoft Build
 Nvidia GTC
 WWDC

References

External links 
 Official website

Conferences
Recurring events established in 2004